Amel is a name. Notable people with the name include:

Given name
 Amel Ait Ahmed (born 1989), Algerian handball player
 Amel Bent (born 1985), French singer
 Amel Bouchoucha (born 1982), Algerian actress, singer and TV presenter
 Amel Bouderra (born 1989), French basketball player
 Amel Brahim-Djelloul, Algerian soprano opera singer and concert recitalist
 Amel Bureković, Bosnian figure skater
 Amel Charrouf (born 1990), Algerian volleyball player
 Amel Džuzdanović (born 1994), Slovenian footballer
 Amel Karboul (born 1973), Tunisian politician and business leader
 Amel Khamtache (born 1981), Algerian volleyball player
 Amel Larrieux (born 1973), American singer-songwriter and keyboardist
 Amel Majri (born 1993), French-Tunisian footballer
 Amel Mekić (born 1981), Bosnian judoka
 Amel Mujčinović (born 1973), Bosnian football goalkeeper
 Amel Senan (born 1966), Iraqi-Turkmen actress
 Amel Tuka (born 1991), Bosnian middle-distance runner

Surname
 Arash Amel (born 1976), screenwriter and film producer from Wales
 Mahdi Amel (1936–1987), Arab Marxist intellectual and political activist

See also
 Amal (given name)